is an Echizen Railway Mikuni Awara Line railway station located in the city of Fukui, Fukui Prefecture, Japan.

Lines

Station layout
The station consists of one side platform serving a single bi-directional track. The station is unattended.

Adjacent stations

History
Nakatsuno Station was opened on December 20, 1928. On September 1, 1942 the Keifuku Electric Railway merged with Mikuni Awara Electric Railway. Operations were halted from June 25, 2001. The station reopened on August 10, 2003 as an Echizen Railway station.

Surrounding area
The station is located on the northern embankment of the Kuzuryū River; further north of it are rice fields.
Approximately one kilometer east are Jin-ai Women's College and Amaike Riverside Park; however, JR West Morita Station is closer to both.

See also
 List of railway stations in Japan

External links

  

Railway stations in Fukui Prefecture
Railway stations in Japan opened in 1928
Mikuni Awara Line
Fukui (city)